Jørgen Jacobsen Sonne (15 October 1925 – 9 September 2015) was a Danish lyricist and writer. He was born in Copenhagen.

References

External links
 Jørgen Sonne in Gyldendal-Enzyklopädie

1925 births
2015 deaths
Danish male writers
Weekendavisen people